Dexter Ryan Cambridge (born January 29, 1970) is a Bahamian former professional basketball player. A 6'7" (2.01 m) and 224 lb (102 kg) small forward, he had a brief career in the National Basketball Association (NBA) in early 1993 when he played for the Dallas Mavericks. Cambridge attended American institutions Lon Morris Junior College (in Jacksonville, Texas) and the University of Texas at Austin.

NCAA suspension 
In November 1991, he was suspended for two months from playing with the Texas Longhorns by the NCAA for having accepted $7,000 from a fan when he graduated from Lon Morris Junior College in 1990 which affected his amateur status. It was alleged the money was a reward for his being named a junior college All-American. His two-month suspension ended in January 1992 when he mailed a $4,600 check to a booster at the junior college, regaining his eligibility status.

References

External links 
NBA stats @ basketballreference.com

1970 births
Living people
Bahamian expatriate basketball people in the United States
Dallas Mavericks players
Fabriano Basket players
Lon Morris Bearcats basketball players
National Basketball Association players from the Bahamas
Bahamian men's basketball players
Nuova Pallacanestro Gorizia players
Obras Sanitarias basketball players
Pallacanestro Petrarca Padova players
Panteras de Miranda players
People from Eleuthera
Power forwards (basketball)
Texas Longhorns men's basketball players
Undrafted National Basketball Association players